McCulloch is a Scottish surname. It is a variation of the Irish surname McCullough. It is commonly found in Galloway. 

Notable people with the surname include:

Alan McCulloch (politician), New Zealand politician
Alan McLeod McCulloch (1907–1992), Australian cartoonist, painter, writer, art critic, art historian and gallery director
Allan Riverstone McCulloch (1885–1925), Australian zoologist
Andrew McCulloch (footballer) (fl. 1970-1985), British soccer player
Andrew McCulloch (writer and actor) (born 1945), British television writer and actor
Andrew McCulloch (drummer) (born 1946), British drummer for King Crimson and others
Benjamin McCulloch (1811–1862), American Civil War soldier
Bruce McCulloch (born 1961), Canadian actor and comedian
Derek McCulloch (comics) (born 1964), Canadian writer
Ellen McCulloch (1930–2005), Australian ornithologist and nature writer
Ellen McCulloch-Lovell, American college administrator
Gretchen McCulloch, Canadian Internet linguist
Henry Eustace McCulloch (1816–1895), Confederate brigadier general in the American Civil War.
Hugh McCulloch (1808–1895), American statesman
Ian McCulloch (singer) (born 1959), English singer
Ian McCulloch (actor) (born 1939), Scottish actor
Ian McCulloch (snooker player) (born 1971), English snooker player
James McCulloch (1819–1893), Australian statesman
Jimmy McCulloch (1953–1979), Scottish guitarist with Wings and other bands
John Ramsay McCulloch (1789–1864), Scottish economist
Joseph McCulloch (c. 1887–1960), American college sports coach
Ken McCulloch (born 1948), British hotelier
Kyle McCulloch (born 1961), Canadian writer for South Park
Lee McCulloch (born 1978), Scottish footballer
Richard McCulloch (born 1949), American author
Robert P. McCulloch (1911–1977), American entrepreneur
Roscoe C. McCulloch (1880–1959), American politician
Warren Sturgis McCulloch (1898–1969), American neurophysiologist and cybernetician

See also
Clan MacCulloch
McCullagh
McCollough
McCullough